Stefan Heckmanns (born 6 April 1963) is a German former professional tennis player.

A right-handed player from Cologne, Heckmanns began competing professionally in 1987.

Heckmanns featured in the doubles main draw of the 1988 Australian Open, with local player Anthony Spartalis as his partner. His only Grand Prix/ATP Tour main draw appearance in singles came at the 1988 Bristol Open, as a lucky loser from qualifying.

References

External links
 
 

1963 births
Living people
German male tennis players
West German male tennis players
Tennis players from Cologne